The Conservative Party of Virginia was a United States political party in the state of Virginia during the mid 20th century. The party formed after Mills E. Godwin, Jr. was selected as the Democratic party's candidate for governor in 1965 due to his openly soliciting the votes of African-Americans.  300 delegates met at Richmond, Virginia and formed the party and selected William J. Story, Jr., assistant superintendent of schools, Chesapeake, Va., for Governor; Reid T. Putney, a forestry consultant of Goochland, for Lieutenant-Governor, and John W. Carter for Attorney-General. In 1969 the party ran Beverly McDowell for governor.

See also
Conservative Party (United States)

References

Political parties in Virginia
Political parties established in 1965
1965 establishments in Virginia
Defunct conservative parties in the United States
White supremacist groups in the United States
Far-right political parties in the United States